Lake Wyola State Park, also known as the Carroll A. Holmes Recreation Area, is located in the town of Shutesbury, Massachusetts. It is a state-run recreation area located on the shores of Lake Wyola.

History
The Department of Environmental Management (DEM), now the Department of Conservation and Recreation (DCR), bought the former, privately run Lake Wyola Park from Emelia Bennett in 1997, and named it for Carroll Holmes, a former Shutesbury selectman and director of DEM's Region IV.

Activities and amenities
The park's  include trails for walking, hiking, snowmobiling and cross-country skiing, restrooms, picnic grounds, and a beach.
Lake Wyola's  provide opportunities for swimming, fishing, and boating.

References

External links
Lake Wyola State Park Department of Conservation and Recreation

State parks of Massachusetts
Parks in Franklin County, Massachusetts
1997 establishments in Massachusetts
Protected areas established in 1997